C. R. Mohite (born 12 April 1952) is a former Indian cricketer and umpire. He stood in four ODI games between 1998 and 2002.

See also
 List of One Day International cricket umpires

References

External links

1952 births
Living people
Indian One Day International cricket umpires
People from Vadodara
Indian cricketers
Baroda cricketers